My Friends Told Me About You is a short film written, produced, and scored by lead actor Carlos Dengler who is the former bassist of the band Interpol. It is co-written and directed by Daniel Ryan and co-produced by Todd Eckert of award-winning Joy Division biopic, Control. The cast also includes Risa Sarachan as Belle and Fredric Stone as Stanley.  The film was shot on digital video tape, in and around the Chicago area during 2007 and 2008.  Its narrative employs non-linear, surrealistic techniques influenced by Mulholland Drive, Buffalo 66, and The Limey.  The film is included on the DVD magazine Wholphin No. 8.

Synopsis
My Friends Told Me About You charts the journey of a man at the beginning of a downward spiral.  Paranoia, confusion, and anger start to color all that he knows to be true and as reality blurs with his subconscious fears, an alternate world propelled by violence and mistrust begins to take over. As sonic as it is visual, Dengler also composed the original score for My Friends Told Me About You in collaboration with acclaimed English clarinettist Ian Mitchell.

Music
Carlos Dengler composed the original score for the film which includes the contribution of English clarinettist Ian Mitchell.

References

External links
 
 Carlos Dengler's Website
 Daniel Ryan's Website
 Pitchfork Media MFTMAY News
 NME MFTMAY News
 SPIN MFTMAY News
 Blender MFTMAY News
 

2008 films
2008 short films
American short films
2000s English-language films